Maaro (Violent But Silent) is a 2011 Indian Telugu-language  action comedy film directed by Siddique. It stars Nithiin and Meera Chopra in the lead roles. The film has been shot in 2005; and in 2006, the film was shelved. Now, after a very long time, to cash in on director Siddique's recent success with Bodyguard, the film was slated for 2011 release. The music is scored by Mani Sharma. The film was remade in Tamil as Sadhu Miranda, which ended up releasing three years prior to Maaro.The film is loosely based on the director's own 1995 Malayalam film Mannar Mathai Speaking which was based on the 1958 movie Vertigo.

Plot
A theft takes place in a bank named DID Bank in the city in which a girl is shot dead, and the manager of the bank commits suicide. The robbery involves Ram Mohan (Abbas) and Ex Minister Venkatratnam (Kota Srinivasa Rao). Sundaram (Nithiin) belongs to the family affected by the theft. He meets Priya. Sundaram faces the consequences in the process of proving that Ram Mohan is the culprit.

Cast
 Nithiin as Sathya Narayan Murthy / Fake Siva / Sundaram 
 Meera Chopra as Priya
 Abbas as Ram Mohan
 Kota Srinivasa Rao as Ex-minister Venkatratnam
 Venu Madhav as Narayana
 Ali
 Kalpika Ganesh as Priya's sister
 Ranadhir Reddy as Ravi
 Sree Vishnu as Seenu
 Y. Kasi Viswanath as Priya's father
 Chalapathi Rao as Doctor
 Rama Prabha as Priya's grandmother
 Raghu Babu
 Raja Sridhar as Siva (Ram Mohan's younger brother) / Fake Murthy
 Mani Sharma in a special appearance in the song “Kannulu Moose”

Production
The film was announced as Satyam Sivam Sundaram.

Soundtrack
The music was composed by Mani Sharma and released by Aditya Music.

References

External links 

2011 films
2010s Telugu-language films
Films scored by Mani Sharma
Indian heist films
Indian action comedy films
2011 action thriller films
2010s heist films
Indian films about revenge